A by-election was held for the New South Wales Legislative Assembly electorate of Clarence on 7 March 1931 following the death of Alfred Pollack. There were three candidates endorsed by the Country Party

Results

|- style="background-color:#E9E9E9"
! colspan="6" style="text-align:left;" |After distribution of preferences

Alfred Pollack died.

See also
Electoral results for the district of Clarence
List of New South Wales state by-elections

Notes

References

1931 elections in Australia
New South Wales state by-elections
1930s in New South Wales